Parliamentary elections were held in Germany (including recently annexed Austria) on 10 April 1938. They were the final elections to the Reichstag during Nazi rule and took the form of a single-question referendum asking whether voters approved of a single list of Nazi and pro-Nazi guest candidates for the 814-member Reichstag as well as the recent annexation of Austria. Turnout in the election was officially 99.6% with 99.1% voting 'yes' in Germany and Austria.

The elections were held largely to rally official support from the new Ostmark (Austrian) province, although further elections for 41 seats were held in the recently annexed Sudetenland on 4 December. NSDAP candidates and "guests" officially received 97.32% of the votes.

The recently completed Kraft durch Freude cruise ship  was anchored in international waters near the United Kingdom to serve as a floating polling station for German and Austrian citizens living in the UK. On 10 April 1938, 1,978 voters (including 806 Austrians) were ferried from Tilbury, east of London. Only ten voted against annexation.

Results

Germany and Austria

Sudetenland

Aftermath
The new Reichstag, the last of the German Reich, convened for the first time on 30 January 1939, electing a presidium headed by incumbent President of the Reichstag Hermann Göring. It convened only a further seven times, the last on 26 July 1942. On 25 January 1943, Hitler postponed elections for a new Reichstag until after the war, with the inaugural to take place after another electoral term, subsequently on 30 January 1947—by which point the body, and the Nazi state, had ceased to exist. They were the final elections held in a united Germany prior to 1990 after German reunification.

References

External links
Electoral poster for the 10 April 1938 Reichstag election and referendum

Germany
1938 elections in Germany
Germany
April 1938 events
Elections in Nazi Germany
Federal elections in Germany
One-party elections
Referendums in Germany
Single-candidate elections